Dea Herdželaš (born 7 November 1996) is a Bosnian professional tennis player.

Herdželaš achieved a career-high singles ranking of world No. 183 on 23 May 2022, and reached a best doubles ranking of 341 in April 2018. As a junior, she had a best combined ranking of world No. 82, which she achieved on 21 January 2013.

Herdželaš made her debut for the Bosnia and Herzegovina Fed Cup team in February 2013, losing to Anne Keothavong of Great Britain.

Herdželaš won the 2012 Serbian national team championships with TK Partizan, winning each of her three singles matches.

Herdželaš has reached 19 career singles finals posting a record of nine wins. Additionally, she has reached 23 career doubles finals (7 titles). All of her finals both singles and doubles have come on the ITF Circuit.

Grand Slam performance timelines

Singles

ITF Circuit finals

Singles: 19 (9 titles, 10 runner–ups)

Doubles: 23 (7 titles, 16 runner–ups)

National representation

Fed Cup/Billie Jean King Cup
Herdželaš made her Fed Cup debut for Bosnia and Herzegovina in 2013, while the team was competing in the Europe/Africa Zone Group I, when she was 16 years and 92 days old.

Singles: 23 (9–14)

Doubles: 11 (5–6)

Mediterranean Games

Doubles: 1 (runner-up)

Notes

References

External links

 
 
 

1996 births
Living people
Sportspeople from Sarajevo
Bosnia and Herzegovina female tennis players
Competitors at the 2018 Mediterranean Games
Mediterranean Games silver medalists for Bosnia and Herzegovina
Mediterranean Games medalists in tennis